John Hamilton Maxwell Staniforth CBE (23 June 1893 – 26 December 1985), known to his family as Max, was a British soldier, railwayman, radio presenter, clergyman and scholar.

Early life and education
Staniforth born  in Hinderwell, Yorkshire, on 23 June 1893 to John William Staniforth and Mary Jane Dobbin Maxwell.  He was named after his maternal great-grandfather, the writer William Hamilton Maxwell. He was educated at Charterhouse and Christ Church, Oxford, where he held a classical scholarship.  His intended academic career was foiled by the onset of World War I.

Military service
Staniforth served as an infantry officer with the Prince of Wales's Leinster Regiment (Royal Canadians) of the  16th Irish Division on the Western Front from 1914-1918.  He was awarded the 1914-15 Star, the British War Medal, and the British Victory Medal. Following his service, he married Ruby Di Stephens in 1922.

Railways
Staniforth became a railwayman on the British railways in Argentina, rising to the rank of Assistant Traffic Manager. During his time in Argentina he had a daughter, Rosamund Ann Staniforth, on 4 April 1928; she would go on to marry Charles Edward Byron Du Cane, son of Charles Henry Copley Du Cane, and grandson of Charles Du Cane.

Radio presenter
Staniforth returned from Argentina, and became the first full-time presenter for Radio Normandy (a commercial English-language service) in 1931. In November 1932 he transferred to Radio Toulouse before taking up a position at the International Broadcasting Company headquarters in London. He then left radio to enter the church.

Clerical life
Staniforth took Holy Orders, and spent twenty five years as a parish priest. 
He was vicar of the Dorset villages of Pentridge and Sixpenny Handley from 1952 to 1963. He retired as Rural Dean of Blandford, in Dorset.

Translation
Staniforth translated Marcus Aurelieus' Meditations for Penguin Classics, and later worked on their Early Christian Writings.

References

Further reading
Richard S. Grayson, (2012) At War with the 16th Irish Division 1914-1918: The Letters of J. H. M. Staniforth. 

1893 births
1985 deaths
English classical scholars
English translators
Commanders of the Order of the British Empire
Alumni of Christ Church, Oxford
People educated at Charterhouse School
Scholars of ancient Greek literature
Translators of Ancient Greek texts
20th-century British translators
Penguin Books people
20th-century English male writers